Bruce Smith (born 1963) is a retired American football player who holds the NFL record for most career quarterback sacks.

Bruce Smith may also refer to:
Bruce Smith (halfback) (1920–1967), American football player, nicknamed "Boo," winner of the 1941 Heisman Trophy
Bruce Smith (Australian footballer) (born 1944), Australian rules footballer for Richmond
Bruce Smith (Australian politician) (1851–1937), member of the Australian House of Representatives
Bruce Smith (Canadian football) (1949–2013), Canadian football player
Bruce Smith (cricketer) (born 1946), New Zealand cricketer
Bruce Smith (luger) (born 1958), Canadian luger
Bruce Smith (Ontario politician), former member of the Legislative Assembly of Ontario
Bruce Smith (musician), former drummer with The Pop Group
Bruce Smith (poet) (born 1946), American poet
Bruce Smith (New Zealand politician), New Zealand mayor
Bruce Smith (rugby union) (born 1959), New Zealand rugby union player
Bruce Atherton Smith (1937–2006), member of the Legislative Assembly of New Brunswick
Bruce D. Smith (born 1946), archaeologist and curator at Smithsonian Institution
Bruce I. Smith (born 1934), Member of the Pennsylvania House of Representatives
Bruce Lannes Smith (1909–1987), American political scientist and communication theorist
Bruce W. Smith (born 1961), African-American animator, film director, and television producer